The 161st Massachusetts General Court, consisting of the Massachusetts Senate and the Massachusetts House of Representatives, met in 1959 and 1960 during the governorship of Foster Furcolo. John E. Powers served as president of the Senate and John F. Thompson served as speaker of the House.

Senators

Representatives

See also
 86th United States Congress
 List of Massachusetts General Courts

References

Further reading

External links
 
 
 
 

Political history of Massachusetts
Massachusetts legislative sessions
massachusetts
1959 in Massachusetts
massachusetts
1960 in Massachusetts